The Hafthohlladung, also known as the "Panzerknacker" ("tank breaker", German connotation "safe cracker"), was a magnetically adhered, shaped charge anti-tank grenade used by German forces in World War II, and was sometimes described as a mine.

Details
The Hafthohlladung (lit. "adhesive hollow charge") was primarily used by Wehrmacht tank killer squads. Designed with three magnets at the base, each with a pair of poles creating a strong magnetic field across their gap, an  infantryman could attach it to an enemy's tank no matter the angle of the surface. As the blast axis should be flush and perpendicular to the plane of the armour at the point of placement, and armed by pulling the igniter on the rear of the mine, the degree of a tank's sloped armour was irrelevant for the device's penetration. However, since this required direct placement on an enemy tank by an infantryman, using the device was very dangerous, since the deploying infantryman placing it on an enemy fighting vehicle  would be highly vulnerable to enemy fire.

The Hafthohlladung device was very effective against armour, able to penetrate 140 mm of rolled homogeneous armour (RHA). The H3 (3 kilogram) and H3.5 (3.5 kilogram) models are easily distinguishable; the H3 is conical and the H3.5 is bottle-shaped .

Specifications
Weight: 3 kg (H3 version) or 3.5 kg (H3.5 version)
First issued: November 1942
Penetration: At 0°, 140 mm of RHA or 508 mm (20") of concrete
Fuse: Friction ignited, 4.5 second delay, later 7.5 seconds in May 1943
Number produced: 553,900
Declared obsolete: May 1944 in favour of the Panzerfaust, but remaining stockpiles used until exhausted

See also
 Limpet mine, the anti-ship nautical "precursor" to the Hafthohlladung ordnance
 Zimmerit, plaster-like coating system applied on German combat vehicles to defeat any similar Allied magnetically-adhered anti-tank ordnance

References

German Hand and Rifle Grenades

World War II infantry weapons of Germany
Anti-tank grenades
Grenades of Germany
Weapons and ammunition introduced in 1942